"Chiefly About War Matters", originally credited "by a Peaceable Man", is an 1862 essay by American author Nathaniel Hawthorne. The essay was inspired by the author's traveling during the American Civil War to experience more of the firsthand. Upon its publication, it was controversial for its somewhat pro-southern stance and antiwar sentiments. Hawthorne was also chastised for his unflattering descriptions of American president Abraham Lincoln.

Background
At the outbreak of the American Civil War, Hawthorne wanted to view the effects of battle firsthand or, as he wrote, "to look a little more closely at matters with my own eyes". He was distracted by the national crisis and had difficulty writing. After consulting with friends Franklin Pierce and Horatio Bridge, he decided to visit Washington, D.C. His wife, Sophia Hawthorne, asked publisher William D. Ticknor to accompany her husband. The two set out in March 1862, leaving by train from Massachusetts through New York and on to Philadelphia, then Washington.

While traveling, Hawthorne witnessed heavy military presence, including guards at railroad depots and scattered military encampments. As he wrote to his wife, "The farther we go, the deeper grows the rumble and grumble of the coming storm, and I think the two armies are only waiting our arrival to begin." During his visit, Hawthorne met Major General George B. McClellan at his headquarters. Shortly after, he met President Abraham Lincoln at the White House on March 13. The meeting also included secretary of war Edwin M. Stanton and secretary of the treasury Salmon P. Chase. Hawthorne had joined a group from Massachusetts who were presenting the president with an ivory-handled whip, though Lincoln was particularly late. Hawthorne stayed in Washington for about a month and took several side trips, including one visit to Harpers Ferry.

Publication history

Hawthorne wrote "Chiefly About War Matters" in less than a month and sent the manuscript to publisher James T. Fields in May. Fields approved it without reading it, to the disappointment of Hawthorne, who wrote to Ticknor, "I wanted to benefit of somebody's opinion besides my own, as to the expediency of publishing two or three passages in the article." Fields soon regretted the decision as well and asked for changes. He tactfully wrote to Hawthorne, "I knew I should like it hugely and I do. But I am going to ask you to change some of it if you will." In particular, Fields asked to soften the description of Lincoln, whom Hawthorne referred to as "Uncle Abe", as homely, coarse, and unkempt:

Though Hawthorne acquiesced to the editorial cuts, he lamented, "What a terrible thing it is to try to let off a little bit of truth into this miserable humbug of a world!" He believed the section was "the only part of the article really worth publishing." In its place, Hawthorne included a footnote which said, in part, "we are compelled to omit two or three pages, in which the author describes the interview, and gives his idea of the personal appearance and deportment of the President."
 
"Chiefly About War Matters" was published in the July 1862 issue of The Atlantic Monthly, then edited by Fields. The removed excerpt was reinserted when republished in the collected works of Hawthorne edited by George Parsons Lathrop, who later married Rose Hawthorne, the author's daughter.

In 1899, Horace Scudder asked Fields's widow, Annie Adams Fields, for permission to restore the omitted passages in a new publication of Hawthorne's works. Though these passages had already been printed in full, Scudder emphasized the previously "injudicious" material would be "harmless and quite interesting in 1900".

Critical response
Many readers of The Atlantic were offended by Hawthorne's essay, and the magazine received "cruel and terrible notes". The concern was partially because it was somewhat pro-southern, but also because it was antiwar. Others found it too ambiguous. George William Curtis condemned it as "without emotion, without sympathy, without principle".

Hawthorne also offended many New Englanders by criticizing Ralph Waldo Emerson. Referring to John Brown as a "blood-stained fanatic", Hawthorne dismissed Emerson's assessment that his execution has "made the Gallows as venerable as the Cross!" Instead, Hawthorne concluded that "nobody was ever more justly hanged."

Analysis
Scholars struggle over how to interpret "Chiefly About War Matters". It has been described as ironic black comedy or satire. In the latter reading, the Peaceable Man and the footnotes added by his fictitious editor both lampoon the state of the country, not only the slave-holding South but also the censorious North.

Notes

References
McFarland, Philip. Hawthorne in Concord. New York: Grove Press, 2004. .
Mellow, James R. Nathaniel Hawthorne in His Times. Baltimore: The Johns Hopkins University Press, 1980. .
Miller, Edwin Haviland. Salem is My Dwelling Place: A Life of Nathaniel Hawthorne. Iowa City: University of Iowa Press, 1991. .
Swann, Charles. Nathaniel Hawthorne: Tradition and Revolution. New York: Cambridge University Press, 1991: 180. .
Wineapple, Brenda. Nathaniel Hawthorne: A Life. New York: Random House, 2004. .

External links
Original text from The Atlantic online

1862 essays
American essays
Works about the American Civil War
Works by Nathaniel Hawthorne
Works originally published in The Atlantic (magazine)